Ante "Mile" Nakić (born 8 January 1942) is a Croatian former professional renowned water polo coach and water polo player. He worked as the head coach of the Yugoslavia national team from 1982 to 1983, while from 1992 to 1995 he coached the Greece national team. At a club level, he successfully coached Olympiacos, Glyfada and VK Šibenik. He is the father of the renowned basketball player Franko Nakić.

Playing career
As a player, Nakić played for ten years (1957–1967) for his home town team VK Šibenik.

Coaching career
After his retirement, Nakić became the head coach of VK Šibenik for eleven years (1967–1978). He then moved to Greece as the head coach for Olympiacos (1978–1979). In 1980–81 he coached Biograd, as well as the junior national team of Yugoslavia. His work earned him the position of the head coach of Yugoslavia men's national water polo team in 1983. He resigned in spring 1984, just two months before the 1984 Summer Olympics and he was replaced by Ratko Rudić. Yugoslavia went on to win the Olympic Gold Medal.

In 1984–85 he coached Chios and the next season (1985–86) he returned to Olympiacos for his second tenure at the club as the head coach. In 1986 he became the head coach of Glyfada and led the club to four Greek Championships (1986, 1987, 1989, 1990) and three Greek Cups (1986, 1987, 1989). From 1992 to 1995 he was appointed the head coach of Greece men's national water polo team. After his stint in the Greece men's national water polo team, he returned to Olympiacos for his third tenure in the club and coached the Reds to two Greek Championships (1995, 1996). He also coached Chalkida (1998–1999), Iran men's national water polo team (2001, 2002–2004), Al-Qadisiyah in Saudi Arabia (2002, 2009–2010) and Slovakia men's national water polo team (2005–2006, 2007–2008).

References

External links
 Ante Mile Nakić career highlights, bio and interview p. 144, A Century of Croatian Water Polo
 Ante Mile Nakić interview (in Croatian)

1942 births
Living people
Croatian male water polo players
Croatian water polo coaches
Olympiacos Water Polo Club coaches
Sportspeople from Šibenik